Alexandra Vasilyevna Velyaminova (Александра Ивановна in Russian) (died 26 December 1364) was a Grand Princess consort of Muscovy; she was married to Grand Prince Ivan II of Moscow. She was the daughter of Vasily Velyaminov, a mayor of Moscow.

Issue:

Dmitri Donskoi (12 October 1350 – 19 May 1389). His successor in the Grand Duchy of Moscow.
Liuba Ivanovna. Assumed the name "Anna" following her marriage to Dmitry Mikhailovich, Prince of Volhynia (d. 1399). Her husband was a son of Karijotas.
Ivan Ivanovich, Prince of Zvenigorod (c. 1356 – October, 1364).
Maria Ivanovna.

14th-century births
1364 deaths
Russian royal consorts
14th-century Russian women